Harkema is a village in the municipality of Achtkarspelen, Friesland province, the Netherlands.

Harkema is in the eastern part of Friesland, 9 km north of Drachten. It was used to be known as Harkema-Opeinde and as of January 2017, the village had a population of 4,295.

History 
The village was first mentioned in 1530 as Opeyndt. The name Harkema means "settlement of the descendants of Buwe Harkema. In 1972, the name was officially changed from Opeinde to Harkema. 

Harkema was originally a peat excavation settlement. The initial linear settlement which mainly consisted of sod houses disappeared in the 18th century, but re-emerged during the 19th century. In 1840, it was home to 484 people. In 1883, a church was opened in a wooden shed, and was replaced in 1891 by a real church. The church was too small, and replaced by the current church in 1913. In the 1960s, Harkema experienced growth and started to attract industry.

Sports
Harkema is home to the amateur football club, the Harkemase Boys. Cyclist Pieter Weening, who was the first Frisian to win a stage in the Tour de France, is from Harkema just as another former cyclist pro, Wiebren Veenstra, is.

Gallery

References

External links

 www.mooiharkema.nl

Achtkarspelen
Populated places in Friesland